Cuttlefish or cuttles are marine molluscs of the order Sepiida. They belong to the class Cephalopoda which also includes squid, octopuses, and nautiluses. Cuttlefish have a unique internal shell, the cuttlebone, which is used for control of buoyancy.

Cuttlefish have large, W-shaped pupils, eight arms, and two tentacles furnished with denticulated suckers, with which they secure their prey.

Cuttlefish eat small molluscs, crabs, shrimp, fish, octopus, worms, and other cuttlefish. Their predators include dolphins, sharks, fish, seals, seabirds, and other cuttlefish. The typical life expectancy of a cuttlefish is about 1–2 years. Studies are said to indicate cuttlefish to be among the most intelligent invertebrates. Cuttlefish also have one of the largest brain-to-body size ratios of all invertebrates.

The "cuttle" in cuttlefish comes from the Old English name for the species, cudele, which may be cognate with the Old Norse koddi (cushion) and the Middle Low German Kudel (rag). The Greco-Roman world valued the cuttlefish as a source of the unique brown pigment the creature releases from its siphon when it is alarmed. The word for it in both Greek and Latin, sepia, now refers to the reddish-brown color sepia in English.

Fossil record

The earliest fossils of cuttlefish are from the end of the Cretaceous period, represented by Ceratisepia from the Late Maastrichtian Maastricht Formation of the Netherlands. Although the Jurassic Trachyteuthis was historically considered possibly related to cuttlefish, later studies considered to be more closely related to octopus and vampire squid.

Range and habitat

The family Sepiidae, which contains all cuttlefish, inhabits tropical and temperate ocean waters. They have an unusual biogeographic pattern; they are present along the coasts of East and South Asia, Western Europe, and the Mediterranean, as well as all coasts of Africa and Australia, but are totally absent from the Americas. By the time the family evolved, ostensibly in the Old World, the North Atlantic possibly had become too cold and deep for these warm-water species to cross. The common cuttlefish (Sepia officinalis), is found in the Mediterranean, North and Baltic seas, although populations may occur as far south as South Africa. The cuttlefish is listed under the Red List category of "least concern" by the IUCN Red List of Threatened Species. This means that while some over-exploitation of the marine animal has occurred in some regions due to large-scale commercial fishing, their wide geographic range prevents them from being too threatened. Ocean acidification, however, caused largely by higher levels of carbon dioxide emitted into the atmosphere, is cited as a potential threat.

Anatomy and physiology

Visual system

Cuttlefish, like other cephalopods, have sophisticated eyes. The organogenesis and the final structure of the cephalopod eye fundamentally differ from those of vertebrates such as humans.
Superficial similarities between cephalopod and vertebrate eyes are thought to be examples of convergent evolution. The cuttlefish pupil is a smoothly curving W-shape. Although cuttlefish cannot see color, they can perceive the polarization of light, which enhances their perception of contrast. They have two spots of concentrated sensor cells on their retinas (known as foveae), one to look more forward, and one to look more backward. The eye changes focus by shifting the position of the entire lens with respect to the retina, instead of reshaping the lens as in mammals. Unlike the vertebrate eye, no blind spot exists, because the optic nerve is positioned behind the retina. They are capable of using stereopsis, enabling them to discern depth/distance because their brain calculates the input from both eyes.

The cuttlefish's eyes are thought to be fully developed before birth, and they start observing their surroundings while still in the egg. In consequence, they may prefer to hunt the prey they saw before hatching.

Circulatory system
The blood of a cuttlefish is an unusual shade of green-blue, because it uses the copper-containing protein haemocyanin to carry oxygen instead of the red, iron-containing protein haemoglobin found in vertebrates' blood. The blood is pumped by three separate hearts: two branchial hearts pump blood to the cuttlefish's pair of gills (one heart for each), and the third pumps blood around the rest of the body. Cuttlefish blood must flow more rapidly than that of most other animals because haemocyanin carries substantially less oxygen than haemoglobin. Unlike most other mollusks, cephalopods like cuttlefish have a closed circulatory system.

Cuttlebone

Cuttlefish possess an internal structure called the cuttlebone, which is porous and is made of aragonite. The pores provide it with buoyancy, which the cuttlefish regulates by changing the gas-to-liquid ratio in the chambered cuttlebone via the ventral siphuncle. Each species' cuttlebone has a distinct shape, size, and pattern of ridges or texture. The cuttlebone is unique to cuttlefish, and is one of the features that distinguish them from their squid relatives.

Ink

Like other marine mollusks, cuttlefish have ink stores that are used for chemical deterrence, phagomimicry, sensory distraction, and evasion when attacked. Its composition results in a dark colored ink, rich in ammonium salts and amino acids that may have a role in phagomimicry defenses. The ink can be ejected to create a "smoke screen" to hide the cuttlefish's escape, or it can be released as a pseudomorph of similar size to the cuttlefish, acting as a decoy while the cuttlefish swims away.

Human use of this substance is wide-ranged. A common use is in cooking with squid ink to darken and flavor rice and pasta. It adds a black tint and a sweet flavor to the food. In addition to food, cuttlefish ink can be used with plastics and staining of materials. The diverse composition of cuttlefish ink, and its deep complexity of colors, allows for dilution and modification of its color. Cuttlefish ink can be used to make noniridescent reds, blues, and greens, subsequently used for biomimetic colors and materials.

Arms and mantle cavity 
Cuttlefish have eight arms and two additional elongated tentacles that are used to grasp prey. The elongated tentacles and mantle cavity serve as defense mechanisms; when approached by a predator, the cuttlefish can suck water into its mantle cavity and spread its arms in order to appear larger than normal. Though the mantle cavity is used for jet propulsion, the main parts of the body that are used for basic mobility are the fins, which can maneuver the cuttlefish in all directions.

Suckers

The suckers of cuttlefish extend most of the length of their arms and along the distal portion of their tentacles. Like other cephalopods, cuttlefish have "taste-by-touch" sensitivity in their suckers, allowing them to discriminate among objects and water currents that they contact.

Poison and venom
A common gene between cuttlefish and almost all other cephalopods allows them to produce venom, excreting it through their beak to help kill their prey. 

Additionally, the muscles of the flamboyant cuttlefish (Metasepia pfefferi) contain a highly toxic, unidentified compound as lethal as the venom of fellow cephalopod, the blue-ringed octopus. However, this toxin is only found in the muscle and is not injected in any form classifying it as poisonous, not venomous.

Sleep-like behavior
Sleep is a state of immobility characterized by being rapidly reversible, homeostatically controlled, and increasing an organism's arousal threshold.
 
To date one cephalopod species, Octopus vulgaris, has been shown to satisfy these criteria. Another species, Sepia officinalis, satisfies two of the three criteria but has not yet been tested on the third (arousal threshold). Recent research shows that the sleep-like state in a common species of cuttlefish, Sepia officinalis, shows predictable periods of rapid eye movement, arm twitching and rapid chromatophore changes.

Lifecycle 
The lifespan of a cuttlefish is typically around one to two years, depending on the species. Before death, cuttlefish go through senescence when the cephalopod essentially deteriorates, or rots in place. Their eyesight begins to fail, which affects their ability to see, move, and hunt efficiently. Once this process begins, cuttlefish tend to not live long due to predation by other organisms.

Reproduction
Cuttlefish start to actively mate at around five months of age. Male cuttlefish challenge one another for dominance and the best den during mating season. During this challenge, no direct contact is usually made. The animals threaten each other until one of them backs down and swims away. Eventually, the larger male cuttlefish mate with the females by grabbing them with their tentacles, turning the female so that the two animals are face-to-face, then using a specialized tentacle to insert sperm sacs into an opening near the female's mouth. As males can also use their funnels to flush others' sperm out of the female's pouch, the male then guards the female until she lays the eggs a few hours later. After laying her cluster of eggs, the female cuttlefish secretes ink on them making them look very similar to grapes. The egg case is produced through a complex capsule of the female accessory genital glands and the ink bag.

On occasion, a large competitor arrives to threaten the male cuttlefish. In these instances, the male first attempts to intimidate the other male. If the competitor does not flee, the male eventually attacks it to force it away. The cuttlefish that can paralyze the other first, by forcing it near its mouth, wins the fight and the female. Since typically four or five (and sometimes as many as 10) males are available for every female, this behavior is inevitable.

Cuttlefish are indeterminate growers, so smaller cuttlefish always have a chance of finding a mate the next year when they are bigger. Additionally, cuttlefish unable to win in a direct confrontation with a guard male have been observed employing several other tactics to acquire a mate. The most successful of these methods is camouflage; smaller cuttlefish use their camouflage abilities to disguise themselves as a female cuttlefish. Changing their body color, and even pretending to be holding an egg sack, disguised males are able to swim past the larger guard male and mate with the female.

Communication

Cephalopods are able to communicate visually using a diverse range of signals. To produce these signals, cephalopods can vary four types of communication element: chromatic (skin coloration), skin texture (e.g. rough or smooth), posture, and locomotion. Changes in body appearance such as these are sometimes called polyphenism. The common cuttlefish can display 34 chromatic, six textural, eight postural and six locomotor elements, whereas flamboyant cuttlefish use between 42 and 75 chromatic, 14 postural, and seven textural and locomotor elements. The Caribbean reef squid (Sepioteuthis sepioidea) is thought to have up to 35 distinct signalling states.

Chromatic

As with real chameleons, cuttlefish are sometimes referred to as the "chameleons of the sea" because of their ability to rapidly alter their skin color – this can occur within one second. Cuttlefish change color and pattern (including the polarization of the reflected light waves), and the shape of the skin to communicate to other cuttlefish, to camouflage themselves, and as a deimatic display to warn off potential predators. Under some circumstances, cuttlefish can be trained to change color in response to stimuli, thereby indicating their color changing is not completely innate.

Cuttlefish can also affect the light's polarization, which can be used to signal to other marine animals, many of which can also sense polarization, as well as being able to influence the color of light as it reflects off their skin. Although cuttlefish (and most other cephalopods) lack color vision, high-resolution polarisation vision may provide an alternative mode of receiving contrast information that is just as defined. The cuttlefish's wide pupil may accentuate chromatic aberration, allowing it to perceive color by focusing specific wavelengths onto the retina.

The three broad categories of color patterns are uniform, mottle, and disruptive. Cuttlefish can display as many as 12 to 14 patterns, 13 of which have been categorized as seven "acute" (relatively brief) and six "chronic" (long-lasting) patterns. although other researchers suggest the patterns occur on a continuum. 

The color-changing ability of cuttlefish is due to multiple types of cells. These are arranged (from the skin's surface going deeper) as pigmented chromatophores above a layer of reflective iridophores and below them, leucophores.

Chromatophores
The chromatophores are sacs containing hundreds of thousands of pigment granules and a large membrane that is folded when retracted. Hundreds of muscles radiate from the chromatophore. These are under neural control and when they expand, they reveal the hue of the pigment contained in the sac. Cuttlefish have three types of chromatophore: yellow/orange (the uppermost layer), red, and brown/black (the deepest layer). The cuttlefish can control the contraction and relaxation of the muscles around individual chromatophores, thereby opening or closing the elastic sacs and allowing different levels of pigment to be exposed. Furthermore, the chromatophores contain luminescent protein nanostructures in which tethered pigment granules modify light through absorbance, reflection, and fluorescence between 650 and 720 nm.

For cephalopods in general, the hues of the pigment granules are relatively constant within a species, but can vary slightly between species. For example, the common cuttlefish and the opalescent inshore squid (Doryteuthis opalescens) have yellow, red, and brown, the European common squid (Alloteuthis subulata) has yellow and red, and the common octopus has yellow, orange, red, brown, and black.

In cuttlefish, activation of a chromatophore can expand its surface area by 500%. Up to 200 chromatophores per mm2 of skin may occur. In Loligo plei, an expanded chromatophore may be up to 1.5 mm in diameter, but when retracted, it can measure as little as 0.1 mm.

Iridophores 
Retracting the chromatophores reveals the iridophores and leucophores beneath them, thereby allowing cuttlefish to use another modality of visual signalling brought about by structural coloration. 
 
Iridophores are structures that produce iridescent colors with a metallic sheen. They reflect light using plates of crystalline chemochromes made from guanine. When illuminated, they reflect iridescent colors because of the diffraction of light within the stacked plates. Orientation of the chemochromes determines the nature of the color observed. By using biochromes as colored filters, iridophores create an optical effect known as Tyndall or Rayleigh scattering, producing bright blue or blue-green colors. Iridophores vary in size, but are generally smaller than 1 mm. Squid at least are able to change their iridescence. This takes several seconds or minutes, and the mechanism is not understood. However, iridescence can also be altered by expanding and retracting the chromatophores above the iridophores. Because chromatophores are under direct neural control from the brain, this effect can be immediate.

Cephalopod iridophores polarize light. Cephalopods have a rhabdomeric visual system which means they are visually sensitive to polarized light. Cuttlefish use their polarization vision when hunting for silvery fish (their scales polarize light). Female cuttlefish exhibit a greater number of polarized light displays than males and also alter their behavior when responding to polarized patterns. The use of polarized reflective patterns has led some to suggest that cephalopods may communicate intraspecifically in a mode that is "hidden" or "private" because many of their predators are insensitive to polarized light.

Leucophores

Leucophores, usually located deeper in the skin than iridophores, are also structural reflectors using crystalline purines, often guanine, to reflect light. Unlike iridophores, however, leucophores have more organized crystals that reduce diffraction. Given a source of white light, they produce a white shine, in red they produce red, and in blue they produce blue. Leucophores assist in camouflage by providing light areas during background matching (e.g. by resembling light-colored objects in the environment) and disruptive coloration (by making the body appear to be composed of high-contrasting patches).

The reflectance spectra of cuttlefish patterns and several natural substrates (stipple, mottle, disruptive) can be measured using an optic spectrometer.

Intraspecific 
Cuttlefish sometimes use their color patterns to signal future intent to other cuttlefish. For example, during agonistic encounters, male cuttlefish adopt a pattern called the intense zebra pattern, considered to be an honest signal. If a male is intending to attack, it adopts a "dark face" change, otherwise, it remains pale.

In at least one species, female cuttlefish react to their own reflection in a mirror and to other females by displaying a body pattern called "splotch". However, they do not use this display in response to males, inanimate objects, or prey. This indicates they are able to discriminate same-sex conspecifics, even when human observers are unable to discern the sex of a cuttlefish in the absence of sexual dimorphism.

Female cuttlefish signal their receptivity to mating using a display called precopulatory grey. Male cuttlefish sometimes use deception toward guarding males to mate with females. Small males hide their sexually dimorphic fourth arms, change their skin pattern to the mottled appearance of females, and change the shape of their arms to mimic those of nonreceptive, egg-laying females.

Displays on one side of a cuttlefish can be independent of the other side of the body; males can display courtship signals to females on one side while simultaneously showing female-like displays with the other side to stop rival males interfering with their courtship.

Interspecific 
The deimatic display (a rapid change to black and white with dark ‘eyespots’ and contour, and spreading of the body and fins) is used to startle small fish that are unlikely to prey on the cuttlefish, but use the flamboyant display towards larger, more dangerous fish, and give no display at all to chemosensory predators such as crabs and dogfish.

One dynamic pattern shown by cuttlefish is dark mottled waves apparently repeatedly moving down the body of the animals. This has been called the passing cloud pattern. In the common cuttlefish, this is primarily observed during hunting, and is thought to communicate to potential prey – “stop and watch me” – which some have interpreted as a type of "hypnosis".

Camouflage

Cuttlefish are able to rapidly change the color of their skin to match their surroundings and create chromatically complex patterns, despite their inability to perceive color, through some mechanism which is not completely understood. They have been seen to have the ability to assess their surroundings and match the color, contrast and texture of the substrate even in nearly total darkness.

The color variations in the mimicked substrate and animal skin are similar. Depending on the species, the skin of cuttlefish responds to substrate changes in distinctive ways. By changing naturalistic backgrounds, the camouflage responses of different species can be measured. Sepia officinalis changes color to match the substrate by disruptive patterning (contrast to break up the outline), whereas S. pharaonis matches the substrate by blending in. Although camouflage is achieved in different ways, and in an absence of color vision, both species change their skin colors to match the substrate. Cuttlefish adapt their own camouflage pattern in ways that are specific for a particular habitat. An animal could settle in the sand and appear one way, with another animal a few feet away in a slightly different microhabitat, settled in algae for example, will be camouflaged quite differently.

Cuttlefish are also able to change the texture of their skin. The skin contains bands of circular muscle which as they contract, push fluid up. These can be seen as little spikes, bumps, or flat blades. This can help with camouflage when the cuttlefish becomes texturally as well as chromatically similar to objects in its environment such as kelp or rocks.

Diet

While the preferred diet of cuttlefish is crabs and fish, they feed on small shrimp shortly after hatching.

Taxonomy

Over 120 species of cuttlefish are currently recognised, grouped into six families divided between two suborders.  One suborder and three families are extinct. 

Order Sepiida: cuttlefish
Suborder †Vasseuriina
Family †Vasseuriidae
Family †Belosepiellidae
Suborder Sepiina
Family †Belosaepiidae
Family Sepiadariidae
Family Sepiidae
Family Sepiolidae

Human uses

As food

Cuttlefish are caught for food in the Mediterranean, East Asia, the English Channel, and elsewhere.

In East Asia, dried, shredded cuttlefish is a popular snack food. In the Qing Dynasty manual of Chinese gastronomy, the Suiyuan shidan, the roe of the cuttlefish, is considered a difficult-to-prepare, but sought-after delicacy.

Cuttlefish are quite popular in Europe. For example, in northeast Italy, they are used in risotto al nero di seppia (risotto with cuttlefish ink), also found in Croatia and Montenegro as crni rižot (black risotto). Catalan cuisine, especially that of the coastal regions, uses cuttlefish and squid ink in a variety of tapas and dishes such as arròs negre. Breaded and deep-fried cuttlefish is a popular dish in Andalusia. In Portugal, cuttlefish is present in many popular dishes. Chocos com tinta (cuttlefish in black ink), for example, is grilled cuttlefish in a sauce of its own ink. Cuttlefish is also popular in the region of Setúbal, where it is served as deep-fried strips or in a variant of feijoada, with white beans. Black pasta is often made using cuttlefish ink.

Sepia
Cuttlefish ink was formerly an important dye, called sepia. To extract the sepia pigment from a cuttlefish (or squid), the ink sac is removed and dried then dissolved in a dilute alkali. The resulting solution is filtered to isolate the pigment, which is then precipitated with dilute hydrochloric acid. The isolated precipitate is the sepia pigment. It is relatively chemically inert, which contributes to its longevity. Today, artificial dyes have mostly replaced natural sepia.

Metal casting
Cuttlebone has been used since antiquity to make casts for metal. A model is pushed into the cuttlebone and removed, leaving an impression. Molten gold, silver or pewter can then be poured into the cast.

Smart clothing
Research into replicating biological color-changing has led to engineering artificial chromatophores out of small devices known as dielectric elastomer actuators. Engineers at the University of Bristol have engineered soft materials that mimic the color-changing skin of animals like cuttlefish, paving the way for "smart clothing" and camouflage applications.

Pets
Though cuttlefish are rarely kept as pets, due in part to their fairly short life spans, the most commonly kept are Sepia officinalis and Sepia bandensis. Cuttlefish may fight or even eat each other if there is inadequate tank space for multiple individuals.

See also
Cephalopod size

References

External links

YouTube video with examples of cuttlefish color and texture modulations
 
The new CEPHBASE within the Encyclopedia of Life (EOL)

 
Commercial molluscs
Articles containing video clips
Cenozoic cephalopods